Makuleh (also Romanized as Mākūleh and Makooleh) is a village in Kenarrudkhaneh Rural District, in the Central District of Golpayegan County, Isfahan Province, Iran. At the 2006 census, its population was 88, in 26 families.

References 

Populated places in Golpayegan County